Ernesto Hellmann (9 November 1898 – 9 September 1952) was an Italian chess player.

Biography
In the 1920s and 1930s Ernesto Hellmann was one of Italy's leading chess players. He was Italian national chess master.

Ernesto Hellmann played for Italy in the Chess Olympiads:
 In 1928, at third board in the 2nd Chess Olympiad in The Hague (+3, =2, -3).
 In 1931, at fourth board in the 4th Chess Olympiad in Prague (+2, =3, -13).

Ernesto Hellmann played for Italy in the unofficial Chess Olympiad:
 In 1936, at second reserve board in the 3rd unofficial Chess Olympiad in Munich (+3, =2, -3).

References

External links

Ernesto Hellmann chess games at 365chess.com

1898 births
1952 deaths
Italian chess players
Chess Olympiad competitors
20th-century chess players